CA-36 or CA36 may refer to:

 California's 36th congressional district
 California State Route 36
 Autovía CA-36, a highway in Spain
 , a World War II heavy cruiser
 Calcium-36 (Ca-36 or 36Ca), an isotope of calcium
 Caproni Ca.36, an Italian aircraft